Lille Kamøya is a small island in Nordkapp Municipality in Troms og Finnmark county, Norway. It is located just off the eastern coast of the large island of Magerøya. It lies where the Duksfjorden meets the Kamøyfjorden, just to the northwest of the island of Store Kamøya and to the north of the fishing village of Kamøyvær. The island helps to shelter Kamøyvær's harbour from the open sea.

Important Bird Area
The island, along with nearby Bondøya, has been designated an Important Bird Area (IBA) by BirdLife International because it supports breeding colonies of European shags, great black-backed gulls and razorbills.

See also
List of islands of Norway

References

Nordkapp
Islands of Troms og Finnmark
Important Bird Areas of Norway
Important Bird Areas of Arctic islands
Seabird colonies